Dargaz County is in Razavi Khorasan province, Iran. The capital of the county is the city of Dargaz. At the 2006 census, the county's population was 73,439 in 19,435 households. The following census in 2011 counted 74,326 people in 21,654 households. At the 2016 census, the county's population was 72,355 in 22,778 households.

Its prestigious ancient name of Abivard (the Apavartene in the works of the ancient geographers, Ptolemy and Strabo) was changed just a few years ago, believing wrongly that it is a later Arabic name. Apavarta simply meant "rosewater" in Parthian and Old Persian.

Administrative divisions

The population history of Dargaz County's administrative divisions over three consecutive censuses is shown in the following table. The latest census shows four districts, seven rural districts, and four cities.

References

 

Counties of Razavi Khorasan Province